Complete Works is a comedy web series first aired on the subscription website Hulu in 2014.

Background
Complete Works was written, produced and directed by Joe Sofranko and Adam North. It starred Joe Sofranko, Lili Fuller, Kevin Quinn, Vicki Lewis, Chase Williamson, Ben Sidell, Lizzie Fabie, Alex Skinner, Michael Keenan, Laurie O'Brien, Daniel Montgomery, Robert Merrill, Jason Greene and Jessica Pennington. The series aired on Hulu and is available to Hulu Plus subscribers. The series premiered on Hulu on William Shakespeare's 450th birthday. The competition is modeled after the English-Speaking Union's National Shakespeare Competition, won by Sofranko in 2004.

The entire series was shot in 20 days and originally created to be a 14-episode webseries and was later re-edited into five 30-minute episodes.

Plot 

Complete Works is a half-hour comedy series set in the world of a collegiate Shakespeare competition. Hal, a naive Midwesterner attending community college, has been obsessed with Shakespeare since his Henry the Fourth birthday party. Winning the American Shakespeare Competition could pull him out of his boring life and give him the performing career he has always dreamed of. The only problem: he has never done an arts competition before. As he deals with the crazy challenges and the challenging crazies, Hal discovers that the road to victory is often paved with douchebag-ery.

Cast

Main cast 
 Joe Sofranko as Hal Evans
 Lili Fuller as Pauline Williams
 Kevin Quinn as James
 Vicki Lewis as Ashley Spitzer
 Chase Williamson as Oliver Belrose
 Ben Sidell as Ian Greenblatt
 Lizzie Fabie as Regan Conrad
 Alex Skinner as Leo Wood
 Michael Keenan as Damien George
 Laurie O'Brien as Deborah Hunterschmidt
 Daniel Montgomery as Loren Dalton
 Robert Merrill as Jonathan Taylor Turner

Recurring cast 
 Jason Greene as Giorgio
 Jessica Pennington as Maria

Episodes

References

External links 
 Complete Works on Hulu
 
 Complete Works

2010s American comedy television series
2014 American television series debuts
American comedy web series
Works about William Shakespeare